Jerry Steelsmith (born November 26, 1935) is an American professional golfer. 

Steelsmith was born in Peoria, Illinois. A native of Glendale, California, Steelsmith played on the PGA Tour from 1961 to 1968. He finished second five times on the PGA Tour: 1961 Hot Springs Open Invitational, 1962 Azalea Open, 1962 500 Festival Open Invitation, 1963 Frank Sinatra Open Invitational, and 1964 Almaden Open Invitational.

He is a former All-Army Champion. He was also captain of the golf team at Glendale College.

Professional wins
this list may be incomplete
1969 Southern California PGA Championship
1972 Central New York PGA Championship
1973 Central New York PGA Championship
1974 Central New York PGA Championship
1978 Central New York PGA Championship

Playoff record
PGA Tour playoff record (0–2)

References

External links

American male golfers
PGA Tour golfers
Golfers from California
Golfers from New York (state)
People from Glendale, California
Sportspeople from Syracuse, New York
1935 births
Living people